Jersey Central can refer to:

Companies of U.S. Mid-Atlantic states:
Central Railroad of New Jersey
 Jersey Central Power & Light, acquisition of FirstEnergy